Middaugh-Stone House and Dutch Barn is a historic home and Dutch barn located at Rochester in Ulster County, New York.  The property includes the stone house (c. 1771), Dutch barn (c. 1790), horse barn (c. 1880), granary (c. 1880), and hoop shop (c. 1890).  Also on the property is a well house (c. 1890) and two family burying grounds.  The house is a -story, rectangular three-by-two-bay stone dwelling with a -story frame rear wing.

It was listed on the National Register of Historic Places in 1994.

References

Houses on the National Register of Historic Places in New York (state)
Houses completed in 1771
Houses in Ulster County, New York
National Register of Historic Places in Ulster County, New York
Barns on the National Register of Historic Places in New York (state)